Common names: Tuxtlan jumping pitviper, Olmecan pitviper

Metlapilcoatlus olmec is a venomous pitviper species found in Mexico. No subspecies are currently recognized.

Description
Extremely stout, females are known to reach a maximum of 77.0 cm in length, males 61.8 cm.

Geographic range
Found at elevations of 800-1,500 m in Mexico on the upper slopes of the Sierra de Los Tuxtlas in southern Veracruz. Also found in eastern Oaxaca, and from northwestern Chiapas to Guatemala.
The type locality given is "crest of Cerro Egega, 1100 m, municipality of Catemaco" (Veracruz, Mexico).

Conservation status
This species is classified as Least Concern (LC) on the IUCN Red List of Threatened Species (v3.1, 2001). Species are listed as such due to their wide distribution, presumed large population, or because it is unlikely to be declining fast enough to qualify for listing in a more threatened category. The population trend is stable. Year assessed: 2007.

References

External links
 

olmec
Reptiles of Mexico
Reptiles of Guatemala
Reptiles described in 1985